Venomverse is a 2017 comic book story arc, starring Venom. It was written by Cullen Bunn and drawn by Iban Coello.

Publication history
Marvel started a new Venom comic in 2016, where the main character was Lee Price, a new host of the symbiote, but Eddie Brock, the original Venom, returned in Venom #6 at fan request. This return was soon followed by the Edge of Venomverse miniseries, starring Venom and alternate versions of other Marvel characters. The actual Venomverse arc was released after the conclusion of the Edge of... miniseries, written by Cullen Bunn and drawn by Iban Coello, who had already worked together in Deadpool & the Mercs for Money. The editor Devin Lewis described it as "the biggest Venom story of all time", and it intended to make Venom an important character in the Marvel universe. Bunn pointed that most of the other main characters were selected because they would seem unexpected hosts of the symbiote. Lewis mentioned Deadpool in particular, and said that "Deadpool is one of our main venomized protagonists. He’s got so much heart and he’s also a source of unpredictability, insanity, and goofiness". Bunn preferred instead his version of Rocket Raccoon.

The series also introduced a new alien race, the Poisons, based on character designs by Ed McGuinness. Venomverse: War Stories was released alongside the main event, and served as a second anthology series based on the characters. It included a story about Punisher, written and drawn by Declan Shalvey. The Poisons were introduced to the Marvel Universe in the "Poison X" arc, a crossover between the Venom and X-Men Blue comics, which set up Venomized, the sequel to Venomverse, by the same authors.

Plot
After a battle with the Jack O'Lantern, Venom suddenly disappears and appears in an alternate dimension, summoned by the local Doctor Strange. He was recruited for an ongoing war between the Venoms and the Poisons. The Venoms are many alternate versions of known characters from Marvel Comics, all of them bonded with a Symbiote. This includes an alternate Spider-Man and the Mary Jane Watson from the Renew Your Vows comic, but also characters usually unrelated to the Spider-Man mythos, such as Dr. Strange, Captain America, Rocket Raccoon, Ghost Rider and X-23. The Poisons are creatures that feed on heroes bonded with symbiotes, which permanently turns both the host and the symbiote into one of them. They are led by a poisoned Dr. Doom. 

Dr. Strange realizes that bringing Venoms to continue the war only gives more prey to the Poisons, so he returns everyone to their native reality before dying. However, the war made the poisons aware of the multiverse, and they decide to explore alternate dimensions on their own. The final scene reveals that Doom actually worked for Thanos, who is also poisoned.

In other media
Different incarnations of Poisons appear as playable characters in the mobile game Spider-Man Unlimited.

In the mid-credits scene of the Sony's Spider-Man Universe (SSU) film Venom: Let There Be Carnage (2021), Venom reveals to their host Eddie Brock that they have "hive knowledge across universes", a concept originating from Venomized Gwen Poole from the Venomverse sub-series Edge of Venomverse and described by her symbiote as being unique to her, before the duo suddenly find themselves transported to the Marvel Cinematic Universe (MCU).

Collected editions

See also
 List of Venom titles
 Spider-Verse
 Sony's Spider-Man Universe

References

External links
 

2017 comics debuts
Marvel Comics limited series
Venom (character) titles